This article stated the results of the World Soling Championships from 1969 till 1979. Unfortunitely not all crew names are documented in the major sources: United States Soling Association (USSA) bulletin "Leading Edge" and International Soling Association (ISA) magazine "Soling Sailing".

1969 Final results 

Only the top 5 places are documented.

 1969 Progress

1970 Final results

1971 Final results

1972 Final results

1973 Final results 

Only a few results are documented:
Only total but no detailed results are documented.

1974 Final results 

 1974 Progress

1975 Final results 

 1975 Progress

1976 Final results

1977 Final results 

Only the top 10 boats are documented.

 1977 Progress

1978 Final results 

Only total but no detailed results are documented.

 1978 Progress
Not enouch data to generate

1979 Final results 

Only the top 20 boats are documented.

 1979 Progress

Further results
For further results see:
 Soling World Championship results (1969–1979)
 Soling World Championship results (1980–1984)
 Soling World Championship results (1985–1989)
 Soling World Championship results (1990–1994)
 Soling World Championship results (2000–2009)
 Soling World Championship results (2010–2019)
 Soling World Championship results (2020–2029)

References

Soling World Championships